The symbol i in mathematical equations may refer to;
 Imaginary unit (i), for which i2 = -1
 Imaginary number
 Complex number
 i, an index variable in a matrix